Mikheil Kalatozishvili (19 May 1959 – 12 October 2009) was a Georgian-Russian film director, producer, and screenwriter active since the early 1980s. His 1991 film The Beloved was entered into the 42nd Berlin International Film Festival. His grandfather was the world famous Soviet filmmaker of the same name, often known as Mikhail Kalatozov. Like his grandfather, Kalatozishvili was born in Tbilisi and died in Moscow, also of a heart attack.

Filmography
1981 Mekhanik
1985 Scapin's Schemings
1991 The Beloved
2000 Mysteries
2006 A Film about Mikhail Kalatozov
2008 Wild Field

References

External links

1959 births
2009 deaths
Russian film directors
Film directors from Georgia (country)
Screenwriters from Georgia (country)
Film people from Tbilisi
20th-century screenwriters